The Timber Wolf is a 1925 American silent Western film directed by W.S. Van Dyke and starring Buck Jones, Elinor Fair, and Dave Winter.

Cast
 Buck Jones as Bruce Standing 
 Elinor Fair as Renee Brooks 
 Dave Winter as Babe Deveril
 Sam Allen as Joe Terry 
 Will Walling as Sheriff 
 Jack Craig as The Boy 
 Bobbie Mack as Billy Winch

References

Bibliography
 Munden, Kenneth White. The American Film Institute Catalog of Motion Pictures Produced in the United States, Part 1. University of California Press, 1997.

External links

 

1925 films
1925 Western (genre) films
Films directed by W. S. Van Dyke
1920s English-language films
Fox Film films
American black-and-white films
Silent American Western (genre) films
1920s American films